The Wenonah School District is a community public school district that serves students in preschool through sixth grade from Wenonah, in Gloucester County, New Jersey, United States.

As of the 2018–19 school year, the district, comprising one school, had an enrollment of 177 students and 19.8 classroom teachers (on an FTE basis), for a student–teacher ratio of 9.0:1. In the 2016–17 school year, Wenonah had the 37th smallest enrollment of any school district in the state, with 177 students.

The district is classified by the New Jersey Department of Education as being in District Factor Group "I", the second-highest of eight groupings. District Factor Groups organize districts statewide to allow comparison by common socioeconomic characteristics of the local districts. From lowest socioeconomic status to highest, the categories are A, B, CD, DE, FG, GH, I and J.

For seventh through twelfth grades, public school students attend Gateway Regional High School, a regional public high school that also serves students from the boroughs of National Park, Westville and Woodbury Heights, as part of the Gateway Regional High School District. As of the 2018–19 school year, the high school had an enrollment of 879 students and 81.5 classroom teachers (on an FTE basis), for a student–teacher ratio of 10.8:1.

School
Wenonah Elementary School served an enrollment of 175 students in grades PreK-6 for the 2018–19 school year.

Administration
Core members of the district's administration are:
Kristine Height, Chief School Administrator
Denise DiGiandomenico, Interim Business Administrator / Board Secretary

Board of education
The district's board of education, with nine members, sets policy and oversees the fiscal and educational operation of the district through its administration. As a Type II school district, the board's trustees are elected directly by voters to serve three-year terms of office on a staggered basis, with three seats up for election each year held (since 2012) as part of the November general election. The board appoints a superintendent to oversee the day-to-day operation of the district.

References

External links
Wenonah Elementary School

School Data for the Wenonah Elementary School, National Center for Education Statistics

Wenonah, New Jersey
New Jersey District Factor Group I
School districts in Gloucester County, New Jersey
Public elementary schools in New Jersey